The women's 4 × 100 metre freestyle relay event at the 2014 Commonwealth Games as part of the swimming programme took place on 24 July at the Tollcross International Swimming Centre in Glasgow, Scotland.

The medals were presented by Maurice Watkins, Chairman of British Swimming and the quaichs were presented by Denise Holmes, Emirates' Sales Manager for Scotland and North East England.

Records
Prior to this competition, the existing world and Commonwealth Games records were as follows.

The following records were established during the competition:

Results

Heats

Final

References

External links

Women's 4 x 100 metre freestyle relay
Commonwealth Games
2014 in women's swimming